The 2004 Woking Council election took place on 10 June 2004 to elect members of Woking Borough Council in Surrey, England. One third of the council was up for election and the council stayed under no overall control.

After the election, the composition of the council was:
Conservative 17
Liberal Democrat 15
Labour 4

Election result
The results saw no party win a majority on the council with the Conservatives remaining the largest party on 17 seats. They gained 2 seats in Knaphill and Maybury and Sheerwater wards from an independent and Labour respectively, but also lost 2 seats to the Liberal Democrats in Byfleet and Horsell West. The Liberal Democrats were the most happy after gaining 3 seats to hold 15, which was their best election for the council in nearly 20 years. Labour suffered a collapse in support losing both of the seats which they were defending in Maybury and Sheerwater and Kingfield and Westfield, leaving them with only 4 seats on the council but still holding the balance of power.

Overall 7 sitting councillors were re-elected, 2 were defeated and 6 new people were elected. Turnout in the election was 41%, a rise from the 2003 election with the biggest increase in Maybury and Sheerwater where it nearly doubled to just under 44%.

Following the election the Conservatives remained in control of the executive with Jim Armitage continuing as leader of the council. Meanwhile, the Liberal Democrats took the leadership of all 3 Overview and Scrutiny Committees.

Ward results

References

2004
2004 English local elections
2000s in Surrey